Liu Fangzhou (born 12 December 1995) is a Chinese tennis player.

On 24 April 2017, she reached her best singles ranking of world No. 127. On 24 April 2017, she peaked at No. 431 in the WTA doubles rankings.

Liu made her WTA Tour debut at the 2014 Shenzhen Open, having been awarded a wildcard into the main draw, but lost to Peng Shuai in the first round. Six months later, Liu advanced to the final of the inaugural WTA 125 Jiangxi International Open, where she again faced Peng, losing in a tough three-set match.

Playing for the China Fed Cup team, Liu has a win–loss record of 1–3.

WTA 125 tournament finals

Singles: 1 (runner–up)

ITF Circuit finals

Singles: 19 (4 titles, 15 runner–ups)

Doubles: 5 (2 titles, 3 runner–ups)

Fed Cup participation

Singles (1–2)

Doubles (0–1)

Notes

References

External links
 
 
 

1995 births
Living people
Chinese female tennis players
Tennis players at the 2014 Asian Games
Tennis players from Tianjin
Asian Games competitors for China
21st-century Chinese women